Oleh Herasymyuk (born 22 September 1986 in Volodymyr-Volynskyi, Ukraine) is a Ukrainian football midfielder.

Career

Dynamo Kyiv
Herasymyuk has been in Dynamo since 2005. He has played in 43 matches in the Vyscha Liha and scored 2 goals. He has also played in 14 in the Persha Liha and scored 1 goal.

Neftchi Baku
In the summer of 2008, Herasymyuk was bought by Neftchi Baku who recently got Ukrainian coach Anatoliy Demyanenko.

On 19 July 2008, he scored the opening goal in 2–1 win against FC Vaslui in the UEFA Intertoto Cup 2008.

National
Herasymyuk has been capped for Ukraine's under-17 and under-19 national football teams.

See also
 2005 FIFA World Youth Championship squads#Ukraine

References

External links
 Profile on Official Dynamo website
 Profile on Official Neftchi website

1986 births
Living people
People from Volodymyr-Volynskyi
Ukrainian footballers
Ukraine student international footballers
Ukraine under-21 international footballers
Ukraine youth international footballers
Ukrainian expatriate footballers
Expatriate footballers in Azerbaijan
Ukrainian Premier League players
Azerbaijan Premier League players
FC Volyn Lutsk players
FC Arsenal Kyiv players
FC Dynamo-2 Kyiv players
FC Hoverla Uzhhorod players
Ukrainian expatriate sportspeople in Azerbaijan
Association football midfielders
Neftçi PFK players
Sportspeople from Volyn Oblast